Marianne Claire Dew (born 1938), is a female former athlete who competed for England.

Athletics career
She represented England in the 220 yards at the 1958 British Empire and Commonwealth Games in Cardiff, Wales.

She won a silver medal at the 1958 European Athletics Championships.

References

1938 births
English female sprinters
Athletes (track and field) at the 1958 British Empire and Commonwealth Games
Living people
Commonwealth Games competitors for England